The 2020–21 season was F.C. Motagua's 74th season in existence and the club's 55th consecutive season in the top fight of Honduran football.  In addition to the domestic league, the club also competed for the 2020 CONCACAF League.

Overview
As coach Diego Vásquez renewed his contract, he led the team for his 14th consecutive tournament.  After two straight defeats against C.D. Olimpia and Nicaraguan side Real Estelí FC at the 2020 CONCACAF League, F.C. Motagua was unable to qualify to their second straight CONCACAF Champions League.  Only one month later, the team was eliminated from domestic contention (Apertura) against Olimpia in the so called "Final de Liguilla" (Playoffs finals).  In May 2021, Motagua was unable to reach another final as they lost to Olimpia in the Clausura Playoff final series in penalty shoot-outs.

Kits
The 2020–21 home and away kits were published on 25 September, one day before their debut in the Apertura tournament.  Unlike previous seasons, no third kit was released.

Players

Transfers in

Transfers out

Squad
 Statistics as of 19 May 2021
 Only league matches into account

Goalkeeper's action
 As of 19 May 2021

International caps
 As of 12 June 2021
This is a list of players that were playing for Motagua during the 2020–21 season and were called to represent Honduras at different international competitions.

Results
All times are local CST unless stated otherwise

Preseason and friendlies

Apertura

Clausura

CONCACAF League

By round

Statistics
 As of 19 May 2021

References

External links
 Official website

F.C. Motagua seasons
Motagua